Wuneng de liliang (无能的力量), English title on CD cover The Power of the Powerless, is a 1998 Mandarin rock album by Cui Jian. The title derives from the 1978 essay The Power of the Powerless by Václav Havel but the album does not specifically reference this connection.

Track listing

References 

1998 albums
Cui Jian albums
Mandarin-language albums